Tornata is a comune (municipality) in the Province of Cremona in the Italian region Lombardy, located about  southeast of Milan and about  east of Cremona.

Tornata borders the following municipalities: Bozzolo, Calvatone, Piadena, Rivarolo Mantovano.

Demographic evolution

References

Cities and towns in Lombardy